Marina Bay may refer to the following places:

Marina Bay, Singapore
Marina Bay MRT station, Singapore
Marina Bay Street Circuit, Singapore
Marina Bay, Richmond, California, United States
Marina Bay (Quincy, Massachusetts), United States
Marina Bay, Gibraltar

See also
 
 
 Marina (disambiguation)
 Bay (disambiguation)